Pectinaria   is a genus of plants in the family Apocynaceae, first described as a genus in 1819. The entire genus is endemic to South Africa.

Species

formerly included
 Pectinaria exasperata now  Stapeliopsis exasperata

References

Asclepiadoideae
Apocynaceae genera